Jyoti Swaroop  was an Indian film director, screenwriter and producer, who was one of the leading film directors in Hindi cinema of the 1960s and early 70s. His most well known films as a director include Parwana (1971) and  Padosan (1968).

Selected filmography 
Parwana (1971)
Padosan (1968)

References 

Hindi-language film directors
Indian male screenwriters
Hindi film producers
Filmfare Awards winners
20th-century Indian film directors
20th-century births
1991 deaths
Film producers from Mumbai
20th-century Indian screenwriters
20th-century Indian male writers